Daniel Machek (born 10 November 1959) is a Czech swimmer. He competed in four events at the 1980 Summer Olympics.

References

External links
 

1959 births
Living people
Czech male swimmers
Olympic swimmers of Czechoslovakia
Swimmers at the 1980 Summer Olympics
Universiade medalists in swimming
Sportspeople from Prague
Universiade gold medalists for Czechoslovakia
Medalists at the 1981 Summer Universiade